Doghead is a 2006 Spanish drama film directed, written and scored by Santi Amodeo starring Juan José Ballesta and Adriana Ugarte.

Plot 
Displaying a fable-like tone and an omniscient off-camera narrator, the plot tracks the mishaps of Samuel, affected by a rare neurological condition and overprotected by his family.

Cast

Production 
A Tesela Producciones Cinematográficas and La Zanfoña Producciones production, the film had the participation of Canal Sur and Canal+. Shooting took place in Seville, Costa del Sol and Madrid.

Released 
Distributed by Alta Classics, the film was theatrically released in Spain on 6 October 2006. The film also screened at the 10th Shanghai International Film Festival held in June 2007.

Reception 
Jonathan Holland of Variety, deemed Doghead to be a "revitalizing, winsomely idiosyncratic" film, with the result of Amodeo's craft being "a visually striking, deceptively subtle item that revels in its unconventionality".

Javier Ocaña of El País, considered that the film possesses "a very special magic and a strange poetry", blending in "a modern visualization and a script between the profound and the candorous".

Accolades 

|-
| align = "center" rowspan = "2" | 2007 || 21st Goya Awards || Best New Actress || Adriana Ugarte ||  || align = "center" | 
|-
| 10th Shanghai International Film Festival || Best Actor || Juan José Ballesta ||  || align = "center"| 
|}

See also 
 List of Spanish films of 2006

References

External links 
 Doghead at ICAA's Catálogo de Cinespañol

2006 drama films
2006 films
Spanish drama films
2000s Spanish-language films
Films shot in Andalusia
Films shot in the province of Seville
Films shot in Madrid
2000s Spanish films